Yulian Levashki (born 2 March 1981) is a Bulgarian footballer who plays as a goalkeeper.

Career
After spending the first six years of his career in home town Vratsa with local club Botev, in 2006 Levashki transferred to Lokomotiv Mezdra. On 16 July 2009 he signed a two-year contract with Lokomotiv Sofia. During his first season with the team, Levashki did not get much playing time, being second choice after Valentin Galev. The titular player's injury at the end of the 2009-2010 winter transfer window, however, made him a starter. Levashki began his stint with solid performances, conceding only 2 goals in his first three matches (his team scoring 9 goals at the same time).

References

1981 births
Living people
Bulgarian footballers
First Professional Football League (Bulgaria) players
PFC Lokomotiv Mezdra players
FC Lokomotiv 1929 Sofia players
FC Montana players

Association football goalkeepers
People from Vratsa